Dzharatitanis (meaning "Dzharakuduk titan") is a genus of sauropod from the Bissekty Formation in Uzbekistan, dating to the Turonian age of the Late Cretaceous. The genus contains a single species, Dzharatitanis kingi, named after geologist Christopher King, who contributed to the Cretaceous geology of Asia. It is currently one of two known sauropods from the Bissekty Formation, alongside an indeterminate titanosaur. In its original publication it was considered to be a member of Rebbachisauridae, but later papers considered it to be a titanosaur.

Discovery and naming 
The holotype was found in 1997 by Hans-Dieter Sues and David J. Ward during the URBAC (Uzbek/Russian/British/American/Canadian) expedition. It was classified as a titanosaur before being given a name on two occasions - firstly by Sues et al. (2015) and then by Averianov and Sues (2017). The genus Dzharatitanis was described in 2021 by Alexander Averianov and Hans-Dieter Sues. It was named after the Dzharakuduk locality in Uzbekistan and the titans in ancient Greek mythology. The genus was based on an anterior caudal vertebra (USNM 538127), likely representing the first caudal, that was originally described as belonging to an intermediate titanosaurian taxon. The juvenile dorsal sauropod centrum USNM 538133 may also belong to this taxon.

Classification 
The phylogenetic analysis by Averianov and Sues places Dzharatitanis in the Rebbachisauridae, in an unresolved polytomy with Demandasaurus, Nigersaurus, Rayososaurus and Rebbachisaurus. The taxon shares with Demandasaurus and the unnamed rebbachisaur from the Wessex Formation a high spinodiapophyseal lamina on the lateral side of the neural spine, separated from the spinoprezygapophyseal lamina and spinopostzygapophyseal lamina, which may indicate a close relationship between these taxa. However,  a study published only a few months later disputed this classification, finding it to be a titanosaur instead, with close affinities to Lognkosauria. The two contrasting results are shown below.

Averianov & Sues, 2021

Lerzo, Carballido, & Gallina, 2021

References 

Lithostrotians
Late Cretaceous dinosaurs of Asia
Bissekty Formation
Fossil taxa described in 2021
Taxa named by Alexander O. Averianov
Taxa named by Hans-Dieter Sues